Mar Theophilus Training College is a Syro-Malankara Catholic Church teacher training college. It is administered by the Metropolitan Archbishop of Trivandrum. Major Arch Bishop H.B. Baselios Cardinal Cleemmis Catholicos of Thiruvanathapuram is the Patron and Manager of the college.

MTTC was in 1956 as an affiliated College to the University of Kerala, with J.Y. Thampi Haris as the first principal. Dr. K.Y.Benedict is the current principal.

MTTC offers courses for Bachelor of Education and Master of Education degrees. At present the college has 21 teaching faculty faculty members, 16 in B.Ed and 5 in M.Ed. It has affiliation for D.El.Ed. too. The present building complex and campus were constructed between 1999 and 2001, in order to facilitate MTTC becoming the first college in Kerala State with all the specifications set by the National Council of Teacher Education. The college offers Ph.D. research facility as a centre of Research under University of Kerala. So far 47 Research candidates are on role; four of which graduated with Ph.D.  from University of Kerala The college is the first Accredited Teacher Education college under University of Kerala with Grade A in 2005. In the second cycle of Re-Accreditation the college maintained A grade with AGPA 3.25. It has got re-accredited in the third cycle in 2022. New floor is under construction under RUSA 2.0 scheme. Now the college is ISO (1995:2001) certified and a permanent member with consultative status with United Nations Academic Impact.
The college URL is www.mttc.ac.in
The college blog address is mttcollegetoday.blogspot.in
The official you-Tube channel of the college is accessed by clicking the link https://www.youtube.com/c/MTTCNALANCHIRA

External links 
 Mar Theophilus Training College

Syro-Malankara Catholic Church
Christian universities and colleges in India
Colleges in Thiruvananthapuram
Colleges affiliated to the University of Kerala